Allegany is a village in Cattaraugus County, New York, United States. The population was 1,596 at the 2020 census. The village is in the eastern part of the town of Allegany, west of the city of Olean.

St. Bonaventure University is south of the village.

History 

The village of Allegany was incorporated in 1906. It was formerly known as "Burton" until an unspecified time; there is a bar/hotel in town known as "The Burton".

Geography

The village is located north of the Allegheny River, and New York State Route 417 passes through the village. The Southern Tier Expressway (Interstate 86 and New York State Route 17) bypasses the village to the north, with access from Exit 24.

Demographics

As of the census of 2000, there were 1,883 people, 753 households, and 445 families residing in the village. The population density was 2,690.2 people per square mile (1,038.6/km2). There were 833 housing units at an average density of 1,190.1 per square mile (459.5/km2). The racial makeup of the village was 96.55% White, 0.53% Black or African American, 0.21% Native American, 2.02% Asian, 0.05% Pacific Islander, 0.11% from other races, and 0.53% from two or more races. Hispanic or Latino of any race were 0.69% of the population.

There were 753 households, out of which 27.2% had children under the age of 18 living with them, 47.7% were married couples living together, 9.6% had a female householder with no husband present, and 40.9% were non-families. 29.7% of all households were made up of individuals, and 15.9% had someone living alone who was 65 years of age or older. The average household size was 2.38 and the average family size was 2.94.

In the village, the population was spread out, with 20.6% under the age of 18, 16.9% from 18 to 24, 20.2% from 25 to 44, 24.6% from 45 to 64, and 17.7% who were 65 years of age or older. The median age was 39 years. For every 100 females, there were 83.5 males. For every 100 females age 18 and over, there were 78.3 males.

The median income for a household in the village was $35,000, and the median income for a family was $51,354. Males had a median income of $39,844 versus $21,761 for females. The per capita income for the village was $17,306. About 6.0% of families and 18.8% of the population were below the poverty line, including 11.9% of those under age 18 and 13.0% of those age 65 or over.

See also 
 Allegany (town), New York

References

External links
 Town and village of Allegany official website
 Allegany Virtual Tours & Photo Gallery

Villages in New York (state)
Villages in Cattaraugus County, New York